Foumbadou  is a sub-prefecture in the Lola Prefecture in the Nzérékoré Region of south-eastern Guinea.

References

Sub-prefectures of the Nzérékoré Region